Sabujbagh is a Thana of Dhaka District in the Division of Dhaka, Bangladesh.

Geography
It has 65517 households and total area 18.18 km2.

Demographics
At the 1991 Bangladesh census, Sabujbagh had a population of 354989, of whom 201,739 were aged 18 or older. Males constituted 54.44% of the population, and females 45.56%. Sabujbagh had an average literacy rate of 60% (7+ years), against the national average of 32.4%.

Education
Schools and Colleges in Sabujbagh
 Sabujbagh Government College
 Sabujbagh Government High School
 Basaboo Boys' and Girls' High School
 Motijheel Model High School and College, Basabo Branch
 Kadamtala Purbo Basaboo High School and college,
 Madartek Abdul Aziz School and College,
 Kamalapur School and College,
 Central Ideal School And College
 Mugda Para Kazi Zafor Ahmed High School
 Ideal School and College, Mugdapara Branch,
 Dharmarajika Orphanage Residential High School
 Moon Light Kinder Garten

See also
 Upazilas of Bangladesh
 Districts of Bangladesh
 Divisions of Bangladesh

References

Thanas of Dhaka